Jøssund may refer to:

Places
Jøssund, Bjugn, a village in Bjugn municipality in Trøndelag county in Norway
Jøssund Church, a church in Bjugn municipality in Trøndelag county in Norway
Jøssund (municipality), a former municipality in the old Sør-Trøndelag county in Norway
Jøssund, Flatanger, a village in Flatanger municipality in Trøndelag county in Norway